Tainan Prefecture was a prefecture of Taiwan under Qing rule. The prefecture was established by the Qing dynasty government in 1887, when Fokien-Taiwan Province was established. The prefecture included the districts/counties of Anping, Kagi, Fengshan, and Hengchun, and the sub-prefecture of Penghu. 

The island was previously governed as Taiwan Prefecture, with its capital at Taiwan-fu in the south. With the reorganization beginning in 1885, Taiwan-fu was moved north to a new location in the center of the island, outside of the boundaries of the new Tainan Prefecture. Thus the southern city formerly called Taiwan-fu was renamed Tainan-fu. This is the name origin of modern-day Tainan.

See also
 Zhou (country subdivision)
 Taiwan under Qing rule
 Tainan
 Tainan Prefecture
 Taiwan Prefecture (1887–1895)

References

Bibliography

Taiwan under Qing rule
Prefectures of the Qing dynasty
1880s in Taiwan
1890s in Taiwan
1887 establishments in Taiwan
1895 disestablishments in China
1895 disestablishments in Taiwan
States and territories established in 1887
States and territories disestablished in 1895
History of Tainan